Year 1071 (MLXXI) was a common year starting on Saturday (link will display the full calendar) of the Julian calendar.

Events 
 By place 

 Byzantine Empire 
 August 26 – Battle of Manzikert: The Byzantine army (35,000 men) under Emperor Romanos IV meets the Seljuk Turk forces of Sultan Alp Arslan, near the town of Manzikert. Although the armies are initially evenly matched, as the Byzantines advance, the Seljuk Turks withdraw before them, launching hit-and-run attacks on the Byzantine flanks. While attempting to withdraw, the Byzantine army falls apart, either through treachery or confusion; the battle ends in a decisive defeat for the Byzantine Empire. Romanos is captured (later released by Alp Arslan within a week), and much of the elite Varangian Guard is destroyed (this will prove catastrophic for the Byzantine Empire).
 October 24 – Romanos IV is deposed by Caesar John Doukas and his political advisor Michael Psellos (after his return to Constantinople). Michael VII (Doukas) is crowned co-emperor – and his mother Eudokia is forced to retire to a monastery.

 Europe 
 February 22 – Battle of Cassel: Robert I (the Frisian) defeats his sister-in-law Richilde (widow of Baldwin VI) and her nephew Arnulf III, in a succession struggle for the County of Flanders. Robert is appointed count by King Philip I (the Amorous).
 April 15 – Siege of Bari: The capital of Bari, the last Byzantine-controlled city in the Catepanate of Italy, is captured by Italo-Norman forces under Duke Robert Guiscard after a 32-month siege.

 England 
 The English rebels under Hereward (the Wake) and Morcar, Saxon former earl of Northumbria, are forced to retreat to their stronghold on the Isle of Ely. They make a desperate stand against the Norman forces led by King William I (the Conqueror), but are defeated.
 Edwin, earl of Mercia, rebels against William I, but is betrayed and killed. His castle and lands at Dudley (located in the West Midlands) are given to William's Norman subjects.

 Africa 
 May – Zaynab an-Nafzawiyyah marries Yusuf ibn Tashfin, leader of the Almoravids, and becomes his queen and co-regent.

Births 
 October 22 – William IX (the Troubador), duke of Aquitaine (d. 1127)
 Ibn al-Qalanisi, Arab politician and chronicler (d. 1160)

Deaths 
 January 26 – Adelaide of Eilenburg, German noblewoman
 February 17 – Frozza Orseolo, German noblewoman (b. 1015)
 February 22 (killed at the Battle of Cassel): 
 Arnulf III, count of Flanders (House of Flanders)
 William FitzOsbern, 1st Earl of Hereford
 April 17 – Manuel Komnenos, Byzantine aristocrat
 May 24 – Wulfhild of Norway, duchess of Saxony (b. 1020)
 August 22 – Lambert II Suła, archbishop of Kraków 
 September 5 – Al-Khatib al-Baghdadi, Arab scholar (b. 1002)
 October 16 – Almodis de la Marche, French nobleman
 December 2 – Ibn 'Abd al-Barr, Moorish judge (b. 978)
 Domenico I Contarini, doge of Venice
 Durand de Bredons, French abbot and bishop
 Edwin (or Ēadwine), earl of Mercia
 Eleanor of Normandy, countess of Flanders (b. 1010)
 Fujiwara no Yorimichi, Japanese nobleman (b. 992)
 Geoffrey of Hauteville, Norman military leader
 Guido da Velate (or Guy), archbishop of Milan
 Henry II, count of Leuven (House of Reginar)
 Ibn Zaydún, Andalusian poet and writer (b. 1003)
 Isabella of Urgell, queen consort of Aragon
 Robert Crispin, Norman mercenary leader
 William Malet, Norman nobleman (approximate date)

References